Ören is a village in Silifke district of Mersin Province, Turkey. It is situated in the Taurus Mountains. The population of the village was 302 as of 2012. The main economic activities are farming and animal husbandry.

References

Villages in Silifke District